Malmeanthus is a genus of South American flowering plants in the tribe Eupatorieae within the family Asteraceae.

 Species
 Malmeanthus catharinensis R.M.King & H.Rob. - Santa Catarina
 Malmeanthus hilarii (B.L.Rob.) R.M.King & H.Rob. - Minas Gerais
 Malmeanthus subintegerrimus (Malme) R.M.King & H.Rob. - Rio Grande do Sul, Santa Catarina, Uruguay

References

Eupatorieae
Flora of South America
Asteraceae genera